Krasnovishersk is an airport in Russia located 3 km northeast of Krasnovishersk. It is a small civilian airstrip.

Airports built in the Soviet Union
Airports in Perm Krai